Bang Khae is a khwaeng (subdistrict) of Bang Khae District, in Bangkok, Thailand. In 2020, it had a total population of 38,915 people.

References

Subdistricts of Bangkok
Bang Khae district